Powiat krośnieński may refer to either of two counties (powiat) in Poland:
Krosno County, in Subcarpathian Voivodeship (SE Poland)
Krosno Odrzańskie County, in Lubusz Voivodeship (W Poland)